Irina Vladimirovna Karavayeva (born 18 May 1975 in Krasnodar) is a Russian trampoline gymnast, competing at an international level since 1990.

Career 
Originally beginning her sports career as a tumbler, Karavayeva soon switched to trampolining and excelled. She competed in the 2000 and 2004 Olympic Games, becoming the first female olympic champion in this discipline She is a three-time European Champion, 3 time World Champion and 2000 Olympic Champion. She belongs to the Krasnodar club and is coached by Vitaly Dubko.

She is well known within the sport of gymnastics as being a dedicated and driven athlete. This was especially made apparent during the 1999 World Championships in Sun City, where she won her third world title, in spite of severe back pain, that put her in a clinic for the following two months.

During the 2001 Trampoline World Championships, held in July, in the city of Odense, the gold medal was awarded Karavayeva incorrectly following a serious judging mistake. Karavayeva, at the World Games in August 2001, made the following statement; "I very much regret the mistake of the judges at the World Championships in Denmark. I consider that it is necessary to correct this mistake and I decided to give the Gold Medal to my friend Ana Dogonadze from Germany in the spirit of friendship and fair-play."
FIG (Fédération Internationale de Gymnastique) rules state that once a medal has been awarded, official results cannot be changed. However, FIG President and IOC Member, Mr Bruno Grandi, made an exception to this ruling and allowed the error to be corrected. This led to Karavayeva being awarded the silver medal.
Following this incident, she received the International Fair Play award from the hand of IOC President, Jacques Rogge.

Karavayeva took the World Record for the most difficult trampolining routine completed in a competition by a woman. The difficulty was 15.60. This record was broken on October 8, 2011, by Emma Smith (GBR), at the Trampoline and Tumbling World Cup, held in Odense, Denmark.

References

External links
 

1975 births
Russian female trampolinists
Gymnasts at the 2000 Summer Olympics
Gymnasts at the 2004 Summer Olympics
Gymnasts at the 2008 Summer Olympics
Olympic gymnasts of Russia
Olympic gold medalists for Russia
Living people
Sportspeople from Krasnodar
Olympic medalists in gymnastics
Medalists at the 2000 Summer Olympics
World Games silver medalists
World Games bronze medalists
Competitors at the 2001 World Games
Competitors at the 2005 World Games
Medalists at the Trampoline Gymnastics World Championships
20th-century Russian women
21st-century Russian women